The 2011 Open GDF Suez de Touraine is a professional tennis tournament played on hard courts. It was the sixth edition of the tournament which is part of the 2011 ITF Women's Circuit. It will take place in Joué-lès-Tours, France between 10 and 16 October 2011.

WTA entrants

Seeds

 1 Rankings are as of October 3, 2011.

Other entrants
The following players received wildcards into the singles main draw:
  Audrey Bergot
  Myrtille Georges
  Anaïs Laurendon
  Irena Pavlovic

The following players received entry from the qualifying draw:
  Lou Brouleau
  Julie Coin
  Anna Remondina
  Constance Sibille

The following players received entry by a lucky loser spot:
  Michaela Hončová
  Albina Khabibulina

Champions

Singles

 Alison Riske def.  Akgul Amanmuradova, 2–6, 6–2, 7–5

Doubles

 Lyudmyla Kichenok /  Nadiia Kichenok def.  Eirini Georgatou /  Irena Pavlovic,  6–2, 6–0

External links

ITF Search 

Open GDF Suez de Touraine
2011 in French tennis
Open de Touraine